Lac de Gers is a lake above Samoëns in Haute-Savoie, France. The lake's water level varies seasonally up by 2 m. Its maximum surface area is 6.5 ha.

Gers